Pano may refer to:
Pano ancient empory somaly

Culture and language
 Páno, one of the family of Panoan languages, within the wider group of Pano-Tacanan languages spoken in South America
 Pano people or Tsimané people, Bolivia
 Paño, a form of prison artwork from Chicano people in the United States
 Pano (caste), a Dalit scheduled caste
 Pano, a 2021 song by Zack Tabudlo

People
Given name
Pano Angelov Apostolov, known also as Karabadzhakov, Bulgarian revolutionary, a worker of the Internal Macedonian-Adrianople Revolutionary Organization
Pano Capéronis (born 1947), Swiss freestyle swimmer

Surname
Alexa Pano (born 2004), American amateur golfer.
Antoine Pano (born 1952), Lebanese politician and retired general in the Lebanese Armed Forces
Ledio Pano (born 1968), Albanian footballer
Panajot Pano, Albanian footballer

Fictional characters
Pano Rodokin, a fictional character from the MÄR manga series

Other uses
 Pano Aqil, a taluka (administrative division) in Pakistan
 Pano Logic, computer hardware and software manufacturer
 Panorama
 Panosteitis, a common bone disease in dogs
 Nondalton Airport, Alaska, with ICAO code PANO

See also
 Panos (disambiguation)

Language and nationality disambiguation pages